Waddinxveen Noord is a railway station in northern Waddinxveen, Netherlands. The station opened on 3 June 1973 and is on the Gouda–Alphen aan den Rijn railway. The train services are operated by Nederlandse Spoorwegen.

Train services
The following train services call at Waddinxveen Noord:
4x per hour local service (sprinter) Alphen aan den Rijn - Gouda (2x per hour in evenings & weekends)

Bus Services
 175 (Rotterdam Alexander - Rotterdam Nesselande - Waddinxveen - Waddinxveen Noord)
 187 (Oegstgeest - Leiden - Zoeterwoude-Rijndijk - Hazerswoude - Waddinxveen - Gouda)

External links
NS website 
Dutch Public Transport journey planner 

Railway stations in South Holland
Railway stations opened in 1973
Waddinxveen